Girlfriend For Hire is a 2016 romantic comedy film  based on a Wattpad novel of the same name by Yam-Yam28. The film was directed by Vanessa de Leon and topbilled by Yassi Pressman and Andre Paras. Produced and distributed by Viva Films and SM Development Corp. (SMDC), it was released on February 10, 2016 in theaters nationwide.

Synopsis 
A rich guy hires an orphaned poor girl to be his pretend girlfriend in order to escape his grandfather’s plan of marrying him off to another woman. In exchange of her service, he gives her a posh condo unit and a big weekly salary but there is a catch: she is not allowed to fall in love with him. Eventually, they start falling for each other and just when everything is going fine, his ex-girlfriend (and first love) resurfaces.

Cast

Main Cast
 Yassi Pressman as Shanaia Nami San Jose
 Andre Paras as Brylle Caleb Stanford

Supporting Cast
 Donnalyn Bartolome as Katie Del Prado 
 Shy Carlos as Elida "Ellie" Leiber 
 Josh Padilla as Third Adams
 King Certeza as Mervin Steve Folkner
 Clint Bondad as TJ Silvero
 Jovic Monsod as Tommy Lopez
 Ara Mina as Auntie Melba Del Prado
 Abby Bautista as Stacy Del Prado
 Ronaldo Valdez as Bernard "Abuelito" Stanford
 Janna Roque
 Clark Merced
 Via Aurigue
 Jelson Bay

Production

Music 
The soundtrack for the film was released on February 21, 2016. 11 days after the premier night of the movie, Viva Records released a digital version of the Original Soundtrack for "Girlfriend For Hire". The digital copy is currently available on Spotify.

See also
List of Philippine films based on Wattpad stories

References

7. Girlfriend for Hire

2016 films
Viva Films films
Philippine romantic comedy films
2016 romantic comedy films
2010s Tagalog-language films
2010s English-language films
2016 multilingual films
Philippine multilingual films